The 1983 Army Cadets football team was an American football team that represented the United States Military Academy in the 1983 NCAA Division I-A football season. In their first season under head coach Jim Young, the Cadets compiled a 2–9 record and were outscored by their opponents by a combined total of 304 to 140.  In the annual Army–Navy Game, the Cadets lost to Navy by a 42–13 score.

Schedule

Personnel

Season summary

vs Navy

References

Army
Army Black Knights football seasons
Army Cadets football